Gerrit Jan Dimmendaal (born 1955) is a Dutch linguist and Africanist. His research interests focused mainly on the Nilo-Saharan languages.

He completed his studies (1973–1978) in African studies, Arabic studies, history, and comparative literature at Leiden University, and graduating with a doctorate in 1982. He has been Professor of African Studies at University of Cologne since 2000.

Selected works
 The Turkana language. Dordrecht 1983, .
 with Marco Last: Surmic languages and cultures. Köln 1998, .
 Coding participant marking. Construction types in twelve African languages. Amsterdam 2009, .
 Historical linguistics and the comparative study of African languages. Amsterdam 2011, .
 The Oxford Handbook of African Languages co-edited with Rainer Vossen. 2020. Oxford University Press.

References

External links
 Gerrit J. Dimmendaal

Living people
1955 births
Linguists of Nilo-Saharan languages
Paleolinguists
Linguists from the Netherlands
Leiden University alumni
Academic staff of the University of Cologne